The Virginia Creeper Trail is a  multi-purpose rail trail. Located in southwestern Virginia, the trail runs from Abingdon to Whitetop, Virginia, near Mount Rogers National Recreation Area and the North Carolina state line.

The trail accommodates hikers, cyclists and equestrians on its descent from Abingdon to Damascus, near the North Carolina state line – passing through National Forest, crossing a number of restored trestles and the Appalachian Trail.

Following Laurel Creek and traversing rolling farm countryside as well as a number of privately owned sections, the route necessitates cyclists open and close private gates. The trail features numerous intermediate access points, and between Abingdon and Watagua, five emergency call boxes can access emergency services.

Travelling from Abingdon, the trail goes through Watauga, Alvarado, Damascus, Straight Branch, Taylors Valley, Creek Junction, Green Cove and Whitetop. From Damascus, numerous private services are available to shuttle cyclist to Whitetop for the  return descent.

The trail is for recreational use, but is also used to host numerous local events and races such as the Yeti Trail Runners events.

History

The trail runs on a rail right-of-way dating to the 1880s — first belonging to the Abingdon Coal and Iron Railroad. After investing sizable capital without actually opening, that company went out of business. In the early 1890s, the company's assets were purchased by the Virginia–Carolina and Southern Railway. It too had financial trouble and its assets were purchased by the Virginia–Carolina Railway.

In February 1900, the Virginia–Carolina Railway began operating in Damascus, Virginia. By 1912, the railroad extended to Whitetop and by the end of the decade to Elkland, North Carolina (now  Todd). In 1919, the Norfolk & Western railroad, which had partially funded the building of the line, took control of it and dubbed it its Abingdon Branch. In 1933, service to Todd ended when the terminus moved to West Jefferson.

In 1957, the last steam engine retired, replaced by diesel-powered engines. By 1974, the Norfolk and Western Railroad Company petitioned the Interstate Commerce Commission to abandon the line. Finally, circumstances in 1977 induced the ICC to approve abandonment, as train service was forced to cease when hard rains flooded and damaged most of the line, which was left unrepaired.

Removal of the track began very soon after and the land in Virginia was secured by the US Forest Service for a recreation trail. The land in North Carolina was returned to the land owners.  In Virginia, the right-of-way is owned by the Towns of Abingdon and Damascus, and by the National Park Service and the National Forest Service.

This colorful and rustic branch line was a favorite of famed railroad photographer Ogle Winston Link. In contrast to his large number of night shots, using black-and-white film and synchronized flashbulb arrays, he photographed the Abingdon Branch during the day, in color. Many of his world-famous images are now housed in the former Norfolk and Western passenger station in Roanoke, Virginia: now the O. Winston Link Museum.

An original 4-8-0 steam locomotive No. 433 is located directly next to the trailhead at Abingdon, and the trail itself passes several restored stations. Two railroad cabooses are also located along the trail; one at the midpoint in Damascus and another at Taylors Valley.

See also 
Cycling infrastructure
Rail trail
List of rail trails
High Bridge Trail State Park
New River Trail State Park
Greenbrier River Trail
Virginia Capital Trail
Fall Line Trail
Washington & Old Dominion Trail

References

External links 
 Official Website of the Virginia Creeper Trail Organization

Iron Mountains
Long-distance trails in the United States
Mount Rogers National Recreation Area
Rail trails in Virginia
Protected areas of Washington County, Virginia
National Recreation Trails in Virginia
George Washington and Jefferson National Forests
Southwest Virginia
Bike paths in Virginia